The Shire of Millmerran was a local government area in the Darling Downs region of Queensland, Australia, about  southwest of the regional city of Toowoomba.

The shire was located in the catchment of the Condamine and Macintyre Rivers and as well as traditional sheep and cattle grazing, industry in the shire included cotton, timber, piggeries and coal mining. The main crops grown are barley, wheat, sorghum and small grains.

History 
The Shire of Millmerran came into existence on 24 April 1913 after its residents and those of the Pittsworth area to the northeast voted to split away from the Shire of Jondaryan.

On 15 March 2008, under the Local Government (Reform Implementation) Act 2007 passed by the Parliament of Queensland on 10 August 2007, the Shire of Millmerran merged with the City of Toowoomba and the Shires of Cambooya, Clifton, Crows Nest, Jondaryan, Pittsworth and Shire of Rosalie to form the Toowoomba Region.

Towns and localities 
The Shire of Millmerran includes the following settlements:

 Millmerran
 Bringalily
 Cecil Plains
 Domville
 Lavelle
 Lemontree
 Pampas
 Tummaville
 Turallin
 Yandilla

Population

Chairmen and mayors
 1925: J. McKenzie 
1927: J. McKenzie 
 2004—2008: Paul Antonio

References

Former local government areas of Queensland
Darling Downs
Toowoomba
2008 disestablishments in Australia
Populated places disestablished in 2008